White Water is a 1993 pinball game designed by Dennis Nordman and released by Williams. The theme is based on white water rafting, which is reflected in the game's 'wild' ramps and very fast game-play.

Overview
White Water is a non-licensed pinball machine with a primary objective of moving your raft down the river to "Wet Willy's" in order to get the "Vacation Jackpot." You move your raft down the river by shooting the flashing "Hazard" shots, each with a unique rafting theme name. Each time you complete a raft, the number of "Hazard" shots you must hit successfully to complete the next raft increases. It takes eight completed rafts to advance to "Wet Willy's." Successfully completing "Wet Willy's" enables the player to attempt the collection of the "Vacation Jackpot." There are subsequent objectives in the game, which include:

Multiball: To start multiball, light the lock ball shot by hitting the "Lite" and "Lock" targets and then successfully shooting the ball in the ball lock, also called the "No Way Out" Hazard; doing this 3 times will start multiball.
Whirlpool: Completing the "Whirlpool" shot will activate one of six awards or modes, which is determined by what is lit when the "Whirlpool" shot is hit. To light the "Whirlpool", thus making the shot active, successfully hit the "Insanity Falls" shot. After hitting the "Insanity Falls" shot, you will know the "Whirlpool" is active when the red light above the shot is lit. One of the six awards or modes starts when the Whirlpool shot, also called "Bigfoot Bluff", is successfully competed.
Big Foot Hotfoot: There are two "Hotfoot" targets in the middle of the playfield. Hitting both targets comprises a complete "Hotfoot", and the "Hotfoot" targets are reset. Depending on the machine settings, successfully completing the specified number of "Hotfoot" targets starts the "Bigfoot Hotfoot" mode which allows the player to get successive "Bigfoot Jackpots."
Lost Mine: Hitting the ball in the "Lost Mine" shot awards an item needed to start the "Gold Rush" multiball. There are three items that must be collected to start this multiball, a flashlight, a map, and a key; and these items can be collected through either the "Lost Mine" or the "Bigfoot Hotfoot." Once all three items have been collected, successfully hitting the "Lost Mine" shot starts the "Gold Rush" multiball.

Game quotes
 "Say your prayers..."
 "Disaster Drop"
 "No Way Out"
 "Welcome to Wet Willie's!"
 "Howdy partner"
 "Ride the Whirlpool!"

Digital version
White Water was available as a licensed table of The Pinball Arcade for several platforms until June 30, 2018.

In 2019, Zen Studios, having acquired the license to develop digital conversions of Williams pinball tables a few years prior, announced that they will release a digital version of White Water as part of the fourth wave of Williams pinball table conversions, due to be available for purchase for Pinball FX 3 on May 28, 2019.

References

External links
IPDB listing for White Water
White Water on Pinside.com
White Water promo video
Rule sheet for White Water

Williams pinball machines
1993 pinball machines